Chimney Rock (K'lpalekw in Secwepemctsin, meaning "Coyote's Penis") is a limestone formation in Marble Canyon, midway between the towns of Lillooet and Cache Creek in British Columbia, Canada. It is located within Marble Canyon Provincial Park.

References

External links

First Nations culture
Rock formations of Canada
Lillooet Country
Landforms of British Columbia
Interior Plateau